ASEAN Center for Energy (ACE) is an intergovernmental organisation within the ASEAN structure that addresses the interests of 10 ASEAN Member States (AMS) in the energy sector.  ACE was established on first January 1999. The organisation assumes a focal job in the ASEAN energy sector. It works intimately with energy specialists/services in the 10 AMS called the Sub-sector Networks (SSN) and the Specialised Energy Bodies (SEB) and with the ASEAN Secretariat, which goes about as the overseer and director of the Endowment reserve. Together, they carry out the ASEAN Plan of Action for Energy Cooperation (APAEC), a blueprint for better collaboration towards upgrading energy. Keeping the region's improvement, sustainable and harmless to the ecosystem is a fundamental concern of ASEAN's energy sector. This concern is shared as a typical subject of each Sub-sector Network in executing its programmes. The executive director is Dr Nuki Agya Utama.

History 
Established on 1 January 1999, the ASEAN Centre for Energy (ACE) is an intergovernmental organisation within ASEAN's structure that represents the 10 ASEAN Member States' (AMS) interests in the energy sector.

By providing relevant information and expertise, the Centre strives for alignment of energy strategies within ASEAN to ensure that energy policies and programmes are in harmony with the economic growth and the environmental sustainability of the region. It is guided by a Governing Council that consists of Senior Officials on Energy leaders from each AMS and a representative from the ASEAN Secretariat as an ex-officio member. Hosted by the Ministry of Energy and Mineral Resources of Indonesia, ACE's office is located in Jakarta.

To support the energy cooperation agenda under the ASEAN Vision 2020 which binds ASEAN Member States in a partnership for dynamic development towards the year 2020, the first series of guiding policy documents was established in 1998. The document, known as the ASEAN Plan of Actions on Energy Cooperation (APAEC) which was endorsed in 1999, laid the foundation for sound policy frameworks and implementation strategies for energy cooperation with relevant dialogue partners and international organisations.

APAEC guides the implementation of multilateral energy cooperation to enhance regional integration through harmonising energy strategies amongst AMS and achieve connectivity goals in ASEAN. It also aims to enhance energy security, accessibility, affordability and sustainability under the framework of the AEC. The current blueprint, APAEC 2016 - 2025highlights strategies on sustainability through, among others, the aspirational target of 23% renewable energy share of the primary energy mix by 2025, and 30% energy intensity reduction in 2025 based on 2005 levels.

On 26 May 2015, ACE Governing Council endorsed the business plan of an Enhanced ACE: a high-performing institution and a regional centre of excellence which builds a coherent, coordinated, focused and robust energy policy agenda and strategy for ASEAN.

Member states

Structure 
On its 20th anniversary, ACE has come a long way in supporting AMS in advancing the energy sector. For the past decade, ASEAN has seen tremendous growth and proven itself to be a significant player in the world's economy. The energy sector is the fuel of all these developments. As a region, we have taken the initiative to challenge ourselves with collective targets that drive us to move forward. The organisational structure of ACE consists of the following departments: 
 Office of Executive Director  
 Administrative and Finance Department  
 ASEAN Plan of Action for Energy Cooperation (APAEC)  
 Renewable Energy and Energy Efficiency (REE)  
 Modelling and Policy Planning (MPP)  
 Power, Fossil Fuel, Alternative Energy and Storage (PFS)

ASEAN Plan of Action and Energy for Energy Cooperation (APAEC) 
The APAEC Department consists of the APAEC Secretariat, Business Development Unit, Information-Communication-Technology (ICT) and Legal Affairs.

The APAEC Secretariat is responsible for coordinating, facilitating,
monitoring and scorecard the implementation of APAEC. To support the implementation of APAEC, the Secretariat organises and encourages the conduct of official meetings, dialogue, capacity building, workshops and other events, and facilitates the engagement with Dialogue Partners (DPs) and International Organisations (IOs). ACE serves as the secretariat for five (5) Specialised Energy Body and Sub-Sector Networks, namely ASEAN Forum on Coal (AFOC), Energy Efficiency and Conservation Sub-Sector Network (EE&C-SSN), Renewable Energy Sub-Sector Network (RE-SSN), Regional Energy Policy and Planning Sub-Sector Network (REPP-SSN), and Nuclear Energy Cooperation Sub Sector Network (NEC-SSN). Additionally, ACE acts as secretariat for the Senior Officials Meeting on Energy Plus Three Energy Policy Governing Group (SOME+3 EPGG) and SOME – Ministry of Economy, Trade, and Industry (METI) Japan.

The Business Development Unit (BDU) was established to develop and execute business plans for ensuring the financial sustainability of ACE. The BDU oversights the proposal preparation, submission, and sustainable business operations and manages and organises commercial events, certification, and other activities.

Information-Communication-Technology (ICT) is responsible for identifying and implementing IT strategies, managing IT infrastructures required to deliver business services, and providing system and procedures to store, process and communicate information and knowledge in digital form and support ICT assistance day-to-day operations of the ACE business.
 
Legal Affairs was established in ACE to provide legal assistance in drafting and reviewing of ACE's official documents and giving advice in settlement of disputes, breach of contract and related matters, including recommendations and negotiation with partners. APAEC is the regional energy blueprint and document under the ASEAN Economic Community (AEC) framework, which plays a vital role in setting a sustainable future of the ASEAN energy landscape. The APAEC has gone through several cycles since its first implementation in 1999 – 2004. In the current process, the APAEC 2016-2025 is divided into two phases of implementation, APAEC Phase I: 2016 – 2020, which was endorsed by the 33rd ASEAN Ministers on Energy Meeting (AMEM) 2015 in Malaysia and APAEC Phase II: 2021 – 2025, which was endorsed by the 38th AMEM 2020 in Vietnam.

ASEAN Plan of Action for Energy Cooperation 
Serving as masterplan of energy in ASEAN Economic Community (AEC) implementation. APAEC assumes a crucial part in determining a sustainable ASEAN energy scene. In this way, it is crucial to foster the document with regional agreement to make an interpretation of it into national policies and plans.

ASEAN Power Grid (APG) 
ASEAN perceives the basic job of productive, dependable, and tough power framework in animating territorial financial development and improvement. To satisfy the developing power need, extensive interests in the power age limit will be required. In perceiving the potential benefits acquired from building up coordinated frameworks, ASEAN set up the electricity interconnecting plans inside the area.

HAPUA  (Heads of ASEAN Power Utilities/Authorities), as SEB, is entrusted to guarantee regional energy security by advancing the proficient usage and sharing of assets. The development of the APG is extended to a sub-regional premise and finally to a coordinated regional system. It is relied upon to upgrade power exchange across borders, giving advantages to satisfy the rising power need and further develop admittance.

Trans-ASEAN Gas Pipeline (TAGP) 
The Trans-ASEAN Gas Pipeline (TAGP) expects to interconnect existing and arranged gas pipeline infrastructure inside ASEAN to move gas across borders to guarantee more prominent security of gas supply.

Coal and clean coal technology (CCT)  
Absolute coal creation and usage has risen. In 2013, electricity produced from coal was 258TWh or roughly 31% of the whole power generation, a consistent increment from 27% in 2010.
 
AFOC is entrusted to advance ASEAN cooperation in the coal sector and advance intra-ASEAN business opportunities.

Energy Efficiency and Conservation (EE&C)  
Energy efficiency, seen as the most cost-effective method of improving energy security and addressing climate change and advancing competitiveness, has been effectively carried out in ASEAN since 1986. The AMS has been following an intentional approach of diversifying and utilizing energy sources effectively to address the restricted worldwide reserve of fossil fuels derivatives and unpredictable energy costs.

Renewable Energy (RE) 
The AMS has created and carried out several renewable energy initiatives, for example, biofuels, solar photovoltaic, and advancing open trade, facilitation, and collaboration. Development was at first dependent on arrangements to reduce oil utilization but later included strategies to moderate environmental impacts of non-renewable energy source use, including the likely impacts of climate change.

ACE forecasts energy related greenhouse gas emissions will rise.

Regional Energy Policy and Planning (REPP) 
Energy strategy and arranging in ASEAN has been grown separately by the AMS, considering that they are at various phases of advancement. All things considered, the degree of joining in energy strategy and arranging in ASEAN is as yet early among the AMS and much should be done to bring the skill up in this area.

Civilian Nuclear Energy (CNE) 
Civilian nuclear energy can assist ASEAN with fulfilling its growing energy need in the region. The Nuclear Energy Cooperation Sub-Sector Network (NEC-SSN) was set up in 2008.

Modelling and Policy Planning (MPP) 
The Energy Policy, Policy Planning and Modelling (MPP) Department is one of the research departments in ACE supporting the APAEC Department to implement the ASEAN Plan of Action for Energy Cooperation (APAEC).

MPP Department has the mandate to assist ASEAN countries in planning the energy policies and how these energy policies implemented through research and data modelling. The research activity focuses on attaining energy security, accessibility, affordability, and sustainability in the region.

MPP Department conducts research and study on Programme Area No.3 Coal and Clean Coal Technology (CCT) in collaboration with the ASEAN Forum on Coal (AFOC) to optimise the role of CCT in facilitating the transition towards sustainable and lower emission development. MPP Department also assists the redevelopment of the ASEAN Coal Database to facilitate CCT investment and partnership.

As a contribution in Programme Area No. 5 Renewable Energy, MPP Department collaborates with Renewable Energy Sub-Sector Network (RE-SSN) through research recommendation to achieve the aspirational target for increasing the renewable energy share to 23% in the ASEAN energy mix and the share of RE in installed power capacity to 35% by 2025, also reduce energy intensity in the ASEAN region to 32% by 2025.

MPP Department supports the Programme Area No. 6 Regional Energy Policy and Planning (REPP) by providing studies through publication of energy outlook series. This outlook identifies the ways in how ASEAN can reach the aspirational targets, and contributes as a reference to develop concrete action plans for
various ASEAN Specialised Energy Bodies (SEB) and Sub-Sector Networks (SSN) in their respective Programme Areas under APAEC.
Related to Programme Area No. 7 Civilian Nuclear Energy (CNE), MPP Department supports regional public communication strategy and plans to enhance understanding on nuclear power generation by developing study and public survey in collaboration with Nuclear Energy Cooperation Sub-Sector Network (NEC-SSN).

To enhance ACE's role in energy data and knowledge hub, the MPP department maintains the ASEAN Energy Database System (AEDS) as a web-based system of integrated and comprehensive energy data and information. The platform provides insights into the ASEAN energy landscape through reliable energy statistics, news, and policy data across the region.

As part of ACE's role as the think-tank and catalyst, MPP Department publishes a number of research reports, studies, policy briefs, and popular articles; organises and participates at various ASEAN official meetings, as well as maintains and expands ACE's networks and collaborations with research institutes, academics, IOs, and business associations.

Power, Fossil Fuel, Alternative Energy and Storage (PFS) 
The Power, Fossil Fuel, Alternative Energy and Storage (PFS) Department is one of the research departments in ACE that supporting the APAEC Department to implement the ASEAN Plan of Action for Energy Cooperation (APAEC).

PFS Department is in charge of supporting countries in their use of conventional energy sources and alternative energy to achieve energy security, accessibility, affordability and sustainability for all. It covers the focus on the power sector (conventional and renewable),  fossil fuels (oil and natural gas), alternative energy (nuclear, hydrogen, etc.) and energy storage.

PFS Department assists the Heads of ASEAN Power Utilities/Authorities (HAPUA) to implement Programme Area No. 1 ASEAN Power Grid (APG) to expand regional multilateral electricity, trading, strengthening grid resilience, and modernisation, and promote clean and renewable energy integration.

PFS Department assists the ASEAN Council on Petroleum (ASCOPE) to implement Programme Area No. 2 Trans-ASEAN Gas Pipeline to pursue the development of a common gas market for ASEAN by enhancing gas and LNG connectivity and accessibility.

PFS Department conducts researches and programmes on Programme Area No.3  Coal and Clean Coal Technology (CCT) in collaboration with the ASEAN Forum on Coal (AFOC) to optimise the role of clean coal technology in facilitating the transition towards sustainable and lower emission development.

PFS Department provides recommendation studies and collaborates with Renewable Energy Sub-sector Network (RE-SSN) Focal Points to achieve the aspirational target for increasing the component of renewable energy to 23% by 2025 in the ASEAN energy mix, particularly on power sector to increase the share of RE in installed power capacity to 35% by 2025.

PFS Department supports the AMS to build human resource capabilities on nuclear science and technology for power generation by implementing Programme Area No. 7 Civilian Nuclear Energy (CNE) in collaboration with Nuclear Energy Cooperation Sub-Sector Network (NEC-SSN).

As part of ACE's role as the think-tank, catalyst and knowledge hub, PFS Department publishes a number of reports, policy briefs, and popular  article; organises and participate at various virtual ASEAN official meetings, ACE own organised events, and external regional/international events; and maintain and expands ACE's networks with research institute/academics, IOs, and professionals/business associations.

PFS Department is representing ACE as the core member of the Global Consortium on Power System Transformation (G-PST).

Renewable Energy and Energy Efficiency (REE) 
Sustainable Energy, Renewable Energy, Energy Efficiency and Conservation (REE) Department is one of the technical pillars of ACE that focusing on renewable energy and energy efficiency to support the implementation of the ASEAN Plan of Action for Energy Cooperation (APAEC).

REE Department is responsible for supporting ASEAN Member States (AMS) in promoting sustainable energy use, including renewable energy sources and efficient utilisation of energy, for achieving energy security, accessibility, affordability and sustainability for all.

In its capacity, REE Department directly supports the Energy Efficiency and Conservation Sub-Sector Network (EE&C-SSN) in achieving the APAEC energy intensity target of 32% reduction by 2025. Guided by APAEC, it supports the development of Sustainable EE in Building and Cooling Roadmap for ASEAN, ASEAN Energy Management Certification Scheme, product registration system, and appliances policy roadmap, among others.

REE Department also directly supports the Renewable Energy Sub-Sector Network (RE-SSN) in achieving the APAEC renewable energy target of 23% share in the primary energy supply and 35% share in installed power capacity by 2025. Guided by APAEC, it supports the development of ASEAN Renewable Energy Outlook, RE R&D nodal network, biofuel and bioenergy studies, and RE Information and Training Centre, among others.

As a think-tank, REE Department conducts research activities on renewable energy and energy efficiency. The research activities then publish as reports, policy briefs or popular articles, reported to ASEAN official meetings and disseminated through public events, such as webinars.

As a catalyst and knowledge hub, REE Department conducts cooperation activities with key stakeholders such as various ASEAN institutions, Dialogue Partners (DPs), International Organisations (IOs), research institutes, professional associations, and media. The activities include joint projects and knowledge sharing.

REE Department represents ACE as the coordinator for official cooperation with IEA, IRENA, UNEP-U4E, GIZ, NSTDA, and CTCN. It is also an integral part of the cross-departmental activities, such as the ASEAN-German Energy Programme (AGEP) and the ASEAN Climate Change and Energy Project (ACCEPT).

Milestones 
 On 8 August 1967, ASEAN was founded in Bangkok, Thailand.
 On 8 September 1988, Signing of ASEAN-European Community Energy Management Training and Research Centre establishment agreement in Belgium.
 On 22 May 1998, Signing of ASEAN Centre for Energy establishment agreement in the Philippines.
 On 1 January 1999, Official commencement of ASEAN Centre for Energy in Indonesia.
 On 3 July 1999, Adoption of ASEAN Plan of Action for Energy Cooperation in Bangkok, Thailand.
 On 3 July 2000, The launch of ASEAN Energy Awards.
 On 5 July 2002, Signing of MoU on Trans-ASEAN Gas Pipeline in Bali, Indonesia.
 On 9 June 2004, The 1st Joint Ministerial Statement of ASEAN plus China, Japan, Korea (ASEAN+3) in the Philippines.
 On 23 August 2007, Signing of MoU on ASEAN Power Grid in Singapore.
 On 20 September 2011, Signing of ASEAN-International Energy Agency MoU in Brunei Darussalam.
 On 7 October 2015, Endorsement of ASEAN Plan of Action for Energy Cooperation 2016-2025 by 33rd ASEAN Ministers on Energy Meeting in Malaysia.
 On 27 September 2017, Signing of Energy Purchase and Wheeling Agreement in the Philippines, between Lao PDR, Thailand and Malaysia.
 On 30 October 2018, Signing of ASEAN-International Renewable Energy Agency MoU in Singapore.

References 

Organizations associated with ASEAN
Energy in Asia